Ivan Marinković (born November 27, 1993) is a Serbian professional basketball player who last played for Telenet Giants Antwerp of the Belgian BNXT League.

Club career
Marinković went through the youth ranks of KK Crvena zvezda and made a couple of first team appearances during the 2010–11 Adriatic League. In September 2011, he joined KK Partizan, a club where he made his first basketball steps. Three months later he signed his first, 4-year long, professional contract. On August 27, 2012, he was loaned to OKK Beograd till the end of the season. In December 2013, he signed with MZT Skopje for the rest of the season. In December 2014, he left MZT. On January 28, 2015, he moved to Poland and signed with Wilki Morskie Szczecin.

On July 21, 2015, he signed a three-year deal with Zadar.

On August 7, 2017, he signed with Turkish club Yeşilgiresun Belediye.

On June 22, 2018, he signed with Slovenian team Sixt Primorska.

On February 4, 2020, he has signed with Cedevita Olimpija of the Slovenian League. 

On August 31, 2021, he has signed with Borac Čačak of the Basketball League of Serbia and the ABA League.

International career
Marinković was a member of the Serbian U20 team that reached semifinals on the 2012 European Under-20 Championship.

References

External links
 Ivan Marinković at aba-liga.com
 Ivan Marinković at eurobasket.com
 Ivan Marinković at fiba.com

1993 births
Living people
ABA League players
Basketball players from Belgrade
Basketball League of Serbia players
Centers (basketball)
KK Borac Čačak players
KK Cedevita Olimpija players
KK Crvena zvezda players
KK MZT Skopje players
KK Partizan players
KK Zadar players
OKK Beograd players
Power forwards (basketball)
Serbian expatriate basketball people in Croatia
Serbian expatriate basketball people in Poland
Serbian expatriate basketball people in North Macedonia
Serbian expatriate basketball people in Slovenia
Serbian expatriate basketball people in Turkey
Serbian men's basketball players
Yeşilgiresun Belediye players